Raccoon Township is located in Marion County, Illinois. As of the 2010 census, its population was 1,541 and it contained 744 housing units.

Geography 
Raccoon Township (T1N R2E) is centered at 38°31'N  88°59'W (38.518, -88.975).. The township is transversed north–south by Interstate Route 57 and State Route 37 and east as far as State Route 27 by State Route 161. Most of Lake Centralia is located in the township.

Demographics

Adjacent townships 
 Salem Township (north)
 Stevenson Township (northeast)
 Haines Township (east)
 Field Township, Jefferson County (southeast)
 Rome Township, Jefferson County (south)
 Grand Prairie Township, Jefferson County (southwest)
 Centralia Township (west)
 Odin Township, Marion County (northwest)

References

External links
US Census
City-data.com
Illinois State Archives

Townships in Marion County, Illinois
Townships in Illinois